Athlete (also styled as ATHLETE) is a 2010 sports documentary film directed, edited and produced by Dave Lam that examines the popularity of endurance sports through the profiles of four individuals – a cancer survivor, a blind senior citizen and twin sisters – who compete in marathons and triathlons. The film was released on DVD and video on demand on March 9, 2010.

Athletes profiled 
The film's principal subjects are:
 Jenny Hinshaw, a 38-year-old survivor of Hodgkin's lymphoma and member of Team in Training member;
 Artie Elefant, a 61-year-old athlete who is blind due to retinitis pigmentosa; member of the Achilles Track Club;
 Carrie Neveldine and Kellie Smirnoff, 35-year-old twins training for their first Ironman triathlon.

Production 
Filming was on location in the United States, beginning in September 2006 and lasting 12 months. The locations featured are:
 New York City;
 Syracuse and Lake Placid, New York;
 Long Branch, New Jersey;
 Miami and Jacksonville, Florida;
 Raleigh-Durham and Boone, North Carolina;
 Lake Winnipesaukee, New Hampshire;
 Washington, D.C.

Races 
Races featured in the documentary:
 New York City Marathon
 New Jersey Marathon
 Miami Marathon
 Ironman Lake Placid Triathlon
 Mighty North Fork Triathlon
 Tupper Lake Tinman Triathlon
 Finger Lakes Triathlon
 New York City Triathlon
 Rochester Autumn Classic Duathlon
 Achilles Hope & Possibility 5-Mile Run/Walk
 Five Boro Bike Tour

Cameos 
Source:
Lance Armstrong, former seven-time Tour de France champion and cancer survivor;
Chris Carmichael, Lance Armstrong's coach and founder of Carmichael Training Systems;
Paula Radcliffe, women's marathon world-record holder and three-time New York City Marathon champion;
Frank Shorter, marathon legend and 1972 Summer Olympics gold medalist;
Dick Traum, founder of the Achilles Track Club;
Dr. Joseph Moore, hematologist and oncologist at the Duke University Medical Center.

References

External links 
 Official site
 
 All Movie Guide
 Internet Movie Poster Awards
 RunningMovies.com

2010 films
2010s English-language films
American sports documentary films
American independent films
American track and field films
Documentary films about sportspeople
2010 documentary films
Documentary films about blind people
Documentary films about sportspeople with disability
2010s American films